{{DISPLAYTITLE:Xi1 Ceti}}

 

Xi1 Ceti , Latinized from ξ1 Ceti, is a binary star system located in the equatorial constellation of Cetus. It is visible to the naked eye with a combined apparent visual magnitude of +4.36. The distance to this system is approximately 340 light years based on parallax measurements, and it is drifting closer to the Sun with a radial velocity of −4 km/s. The proximity of the star to the ecliptic means it is subject to lunar occultations.

The spectroscopic binary nature of Xi1 Ceti was discovered in 1901 by William Wallace Campbell using the Mills spectrograph at the Lick Observatory. It is a suspected eclipsing binary with an amplitude of 0.03 in magnitude, which would suggest the orbital plane has a high inclination.

Morgan and Keenan in 1973 had classified it as a bright giant star with an anomalous underabundance of the CN molecule. Evidence has been found for an overabundance of s-process elements, although this is disputed. The star has 3.8 times the mass and 18 times the radius of the Sun. The companion, component B, is a small white dwarf companion with 80% of the mass of the Sun and a class of DA4. It was detected in 1985 by its ultraviolet emission.

Consequently, the Chinese name for Xi1 Ceti itself is "the Fifth Star of Circular Celestial Granary", .

References

External links

http://server3.wikisky.org/starview?object_type=1&object_id=979
http://www.alcyone.de/cgi-bin/search.pl?object=HR0649 

G-type giants
Barium stars
White dwarfs
Spectroscopic binaries

Cetus (constellation)
Ceti, Xi1
Durchmusterung objects
Ceti, 65
013611
010324
0649